Makalamabedi Airport  is an airport serving the village of Makalamabedi in the Central District of Botswana. The runway is across the Boteti River from the village, in North-West District.

See also

Transport in Botswana
List of airports in Botswana

References

External links
OpenStreetMap - Makalamabedi
OurAirports - Makalamabedi
SkyVector - Makalamabedi

Airports in Botswana